After Silence is the eighth novel by the American writer Jonathan Carroll, published in 1992. It tells the story of a successful cartoonist, the protagonist Max Fischer,  who fell in love with a woman. Later he discovers many secrets, including a terrifying crime, about the woman and is confused about what to do.

Reviews of the novel are mixed. LA Times Reviewer Susan Heeger, thought the plot had a strong design, but was not expertly told: "Carroll's book doesn't rise above the level of an intriguing cautionary tale over-directed by someone anxious to get his point across." Publishers Weekly had a much more positive review, writing that the novel is "An electrifying, unforgettable novel that unfolds with the logic of a Greek tragedy, Carroll's parable on moral cowardice [has an] uncompromising honesty about how secrets gnaw and kill." The London Review of Books describes the novel as representing the American "everyday"  with "delicate descriptions".

References

External links 
 

Novels by Jonathan Carroll
1992 American novels